Erionota is a genus of skippers in the family Hesperiidae. It is found in the Indomalayan realm

Species
Erionota acroleuca (Wood-Mason & de Nicéville, 1881) Vietnam
Erionota grandis (Leech, 1890) West China
Erionota harmachis (Hewitson, 1878) Sumatra
Erionota hiraca (Moore, 1881) Sikkim to Burma, Thailand, North Vietnam, Malaya, Singapore, Borneo, Nias, Batoe, Sipora, Java, Bali, Lombok and (E. h. sakita (Ribbe, 1889)) Sulawesi, Bangka, Banggai, Sula Island
Erionota hislopi Evans, 1956
Erionota surprisa de Jong & Treadaway, 1993 Leyte (Philippines)
Erionota sybirita (Hewitson, 1876)
Erionota thrax (Linnaeus, 1767)
Erionota tribus Evans, 1941 Celebes
Erionota torus Evans, 1941

Biology
The larvae feed on Gramineae, Palmae and Musaceae.

References

Natural History Museum Lepidoptera genus database
Erionota at funet

Erionotini
Hesperiidae genera